Stuart H Ralston is an academic physician based at the University of Edinburgh, where he is affiliated with the Centre for Genomic and Experimental Medicine. He has written extensively on the molecular and genetic   basis of osteoporosis, Paget's disease of bone and other bone and joint diseases.

Current status
In addition to his Professorship, Ralston is a rheumatologist with NHS Lothian, where he is the clinical lead for the osteoporosis service and the clinical director of the rheumatology service.

Ralston serves as joint editor-in-chief of Calcified Tissue International and editor of Davidson's Principles and Practice of Medicine. He was chair of the Commission on Human Medicines for the Medicines and Healthcare products Regulatory Agency of the UK between 2013 and 2021. He is currently chair of the board of trustees of the Paget's Association [htpps://www.paget.org.uk] a UK charity that funds research, raises awareness and provides support for those affected by Paget's disease of bone.

Fellowships
2015, Honorary Fellow of the Faculty of Pharmaceutical Medicine, FFPM
2005, Fellow of the Royal Society of Edinburgh, FRSE
1999, Fellow of the Academy of Medical Sciences, FMedSci
1994, Fellow of the Royal College of Physicians Edinburgh, FRCP (Edin)
1980, Member of the Royal College of Physicians, MRCP

References

British rheumatologists
Living people
Date of birth missing (living people)
Professorships at the University of Edinburgh
Year of birth missing (living people)